This list of mines in Russia is subsidiary to the list of mines article and lists working, defunct and future mines in the country organized by primary mineral output. For practical reasons, this list also contains stone, marble and other quarries.

Bentonite
Liublinskaya mine

Beryllium
Yermakovsky mine

Chromium
Aganozersky mine
Shalozersky chromium mine

Coal
Chulmakansky coal mine
Khangalassky coal mine
Listvianskaya coal mine
Neryungrinsky coal mine
Pereyaslavskoye coal mine
Sakhalin coal mine
Tsentralnyi coal mine
Tugnui coal mine
Urgal coal mine
Usinsky coal mine
Yubileynaya mine
Zhernovskoye coal mine

Cobalt
Karakul deposit

Copper
Bakr-Tay mine
Blyavinsky mine
Central Zhdanovskoye mine
Degtyarsky mine
Gaysky mine
Kirovgradsky mine
Komsomolsky mine
Kotselvaara mine
Lavrovo-Nikolaevsky mine
Letneye mine
Mayak mine
Medvezhy Ruchey mine
Molodezhny mine
Oktyabrskoye mine
Severny mine
Solnechny mine
Sorsky mine
Tash-Tau mine
Taymyrsky mine
Turyinsky mine
Uchalinsky mine
Urupsky mine
Uzelginskaya mine
Vostok mine
Western Zhdanovskoye mine
Zapolyarny mine
Zolotushinsky mine

Diamonds
Dalnyaya diamond mine
Ebelyakh River diamond mine
Internationalnaya diamond mine
Maiskoye diamond mine
Mirny GOK
Popigai astrobleme mine
Udachny GOK
Verkhne-Munskoye diamond mine
Zarnitsa mine

Fluorite
Egitinskoye mine
Garsonuiskoe mine
Kalanguyskoye mine
Preobrazhenovskoye mine
Solonechnoye mine
Suranskoye mine
Voznesenka mine
Yaroslavsky mine

Gold
Albazino mine
Bolshoy Kuranah mine
Gora Rudnaya mine
Kultumin mine
Kyuchus mine
Nezhdaninka mine
Omolon mine
Pioneer mine
Sukhoi Log mine

Graphite
Ulur mine

Iron

Lead
Kholodninsky mine
Kyzyl-Tash Turk mine
Noyon-Tologoisky mine
Ozyorny mine

Lithium
Alakhinskoye mine
Vishnyakovskoe mine

Manganese
Usinskoe mine

Mercury
Terligkhaiskoye mine

Molybdenum
Agaskyrskoe mine
 Bugdai mine
Bugdainskoe mine
Lobash mine
Metrekskoye mine
Sorsk mine
Zharchikhinski mine
Zhireken mine

Nickel
Aganozersky mine
Kun-Manie mine
Maslovskoye mine
Verkhnekingashskoye mine

Phosphates
Oleniy Ruchey mine
Selemdzha mine
Tomtor mine

Potash
Synnyr mine
Talitsky mine

Silver
Bugdai mine
Derbeke-Nelgesinsky mine
Karakul deposit
Prognoz mine
Taryno-Kurdatsky mine

Tantalum
Etykinskoye mine
Katuginskoy mine
Orlovskoye mine
Ulug-Tanzekskoye mine
Voznesenovskoye mine

Tin
Pyrkakay mine

Titanium
Pudozhsky mine
Yugo-Vostochnaya Gremyakha mine

Uranium
Dalmatovkoye mine
Elkon mine
Khiagdinskoye mine
Olovskoye mine

Vanadium
Padma mine

Zinc
Kholodninsky mine
Kyzyl-Tash Turk mine
Noyon-Tologoisky mine
Ozyorny mine

References

Russia